Roberta D'Adda (born 5 October 1981) is a former Italian football who played as a defender. She has won four leagues with ASD Fiammamonza, CF Bardolino and ACF Brescia. D'Adda was part of the Italian squad at the 2009 and 2013 editions of the UEFA Women's Championship.

International career
D'Adda made her senior debut for the Italy women's national football team in June 2006, in a 7–0 win over Serbia and Montenegro in Belgrade during qualifying for the 2007 FIFA Women's World Cup.

At UEFA Women's Euro 2009 in Finland, D'Adda played in all four games as the Italians reached the quarter-finals. National coach Antonio Cabrini named D'Adda in his selection for UEFA Women's Euro 2013 in Sweden. In the 2015 FIFA World Cup qualifiers she scored her first goal for the national team. She hasn't taken part in subsequent qualifying stages.

Honours
 Titles
 Serie A (4): 2005–06, 2008–09, 2013–14, 2015–16
 Coppa Italia (4): 2008–09, 2011–12, 2014–15, 2015–16
 Supercoppa Italiana (5): 2005–06, 2013–14, 2014–15, 2015–16, 2016–17
 Best result in other competitions
 UEFA Champions League (quarterfinalist): 2015–16

References

External links

1981 births
Living people
People from Vimercate
Italian women's footballers
Italy women's international footballers
Serie A (women's football) players
A.S.D. AGSM Verona F.C. players
A.C.F. Brescia Calcio Femminile players
Women's association football defenders
U.S. Sassuolo Calcio (women) players
ASD Fiammamonza 1970 players
Inter Milan (women) players
Footballers from Lombardy
Sportspeople from the Province of Monza e Brianza